The Beyenchime (Beyençime) is a river in Yakutia (Sakha Republic), Russia.

The river flows north of the Arctic Circle across a lonely, desolate area of the Olenyoksky District devoid of settlements. The Beyenchime-Udzha interfluve is an area where diamonds are found.

Course  
The Beyenchime is a left tributary of the Olenyok. Its sources are at the limit of the Northern Siberian Lowland, in the vicinity of the sources of the Bur and the Udya. It flows roughly eastwards to the south of the Bur and to the north of the Kuoika. To the south and southwest of its middle course there is a large area dotted with lakes. In its last stretch the Beyenchime turns into the Central Siberian Plateau and heads in a SSE direction until its mouth in the Olenyok,  from its mouth.

The river is frozen between early October and late May and may cause floods in the summer. There is an impact crater south of the lower course of the Beyenchime Salaata.

See also
Beyenchime-Salaata crater
List of rivers of Russia

References

External links 
Fishing & Tourism in Yakutia
Crater Taphonomy and Bombardment Rates in the Phanerozoic

Rivers of the Sakha Republic
North Siberian Lowland
Tributaries of the Olenyok